2-tert-Butyl-1,1,3,3-tetramethylguanidine is an organic base, also known as Barton's base. It is named after Nobel Prize-winning British chemist Derek Barton. Barton and his assistants prepared a series of guanidines with steric hindrance in 1982; in this case five alkyl groups: four methyl groups and one tert-butyl group. In 50% water ethanol mixture, the acidity constant (pKa) of Barton's base is 14. In acetonitrile its pKa is 24.31.

Synthesis 
The base is prepared by the reaction of tert-butylamine with a Vilsmeier salt. The latter is the reaction product of phosgene with tetramethylurea.

Applications 
Barton's base can be used in many organic reactions, including in alkylations and in the formation of aziridines. It is often a milder alternative to traditional, strong inorganic bases.

References

Guanidines
Non-nucleophilic bases